Sun is an R&B, soul, disco, and funk band that was formed in the mid-1970s and recorded prolifically for Capitol Records from 1976 to 1984. The band was founded by Byron Byrd in Dayton, Ohio, in 1976. Additional members included Kym Yancey, Chris Jones, Gary King, John Wagner, Hollis Melson, and Shawn Sandridge.

History
After being signed to Capitol by Larkin Arnold, Sun was faced with an immediate problem: an incomplete band. The gap was in the rhythm section, so Byron Byrd recruited Roger Troutman and Lester Troutman (now with Zapp) and paid them to do some studio sessions so he could get the album finished. Lester laid drum tracks with Roger on bass, then Roger overdubbed guitar for four songs on the album, including  "Live On, Dream On."  It was on "Wanna Make Love (Come Flick My BIC)" that Troutman (Roger) contributed his signature Talk Box embellishments.

As the first single from the debut LP, Live On, Dream On (1976), "Wanna Make Love" became Sun's first hit, peaking at #31 on Billboard’s R&B chart.

With the release of their second album, Sun Power (pressed on orange vinyl in 1977), Sun sprang into a ten-piece configuration of multi-instrumentalists and vocalists that consisted of Byron Byrd, John Hampton Wagner, Christopher D. Jones, Hollis Melson, Dean Hummons, Kym Yancey, Shawn Sandridge, Bruce Hastell, Gary King and Ernie Knisley. The album also contained “Conscience,” the song "Time Is Passing” (used and sampled many Rap Artists including Dr. Dre) plus the instrumental “We’re So Hot,” which has been used in sports telecasts.

Sun had people from NASA do the cover animation for their fifth album, Sun Over The Universe (1980)

Original group members
 Byron M. Byrd (tenor saxophone, keyboards, vocals) 
 Kym Yancey (drums)
 John Wagner (trumpet, vocals)
 Chris Jones (trumpet, vocals)
 Hollis Melson (bass, vocals)
 Shawn Sandridge (guitar)
 Note: Roger Troutman played guitar and talk box on 1st SUN LP Live On, Dream On (1976)
 Note: Lester Troutman played Drums on 1st SUN LP Live On, Dream On (1976)

Discography
Wanna Make Love (1976)
Sun Power (1977)
Sunburn (1978)
Destination Sun (1979)
Sun Over the Universe (1980) 
Force of Nature (1981)
Let There Be Sun (1982)
Eclipse (1984)

Influences
SUN's songs have been covered and sampled by numerous artists, including:
MC Eiht 'Streiht Up Menace' ('Menace to Society' Title Movie Soundtrack) covered  My Woman

Television
United Negro College Fund "Cavalcade of Stars" Telethon, James Brown's Future Shock (TV series),    Soul Train – SUN 'The Show Is Over', Soul Train - SUN, 'Wanna Make Love (Come Flick My Bic)',   Soul Train - SUN, 'Sun Is Here',   Soul Train - SUN, 'Pure Fire',   WHIO-TV, ABC Celebrity Superstars.

References

American rhythm and blues musical groups
Funk musical groups from Dayton, Ohio